The mission of the Madison, Wisconsin-based International Breast Cancer Research Foundation (IBCRF) (1993–2015) was to pursue cost-effective, clinical research with the aim of alleviating the difficult circumstances of women throughout the world. Peer-reviewed research at the organization was generously funded by the National Institutes of Health, The Susan G. Komen Foundation, and the Breast Cancer Research Foundation.

Changes in the National Institutes of Health/National Cancer Institute funding rules for international projects, however, rendered the organization's mission untenable. As a consequence, the organization’s board and scientific director agreed to close the organization on July 1, 2015. Following closure, the IBCRF tissues sample bank was given at no cost to the University of North Carolina, Breast Cancer Research Program.

During its 22-year tenure, the IBCRF was recognized for its high ethical standards of research. In 1997, Scientific Director Dr. Richard R. Love was awarded the Westerman Prize in Clinical Research Ethics by the American Federation for Medical Research. Results of the organization’s recent major clinical research activities were published in the following major scientific peer-reviewed articles:

Love, R.R., Young, G.S., Laudico, A.V.,  Dinh, N.V. et al. : Bone mineral density changes following surgical oophorectomy and tamoxifen adjuvant therapy for operable breast cancer in pre-menopausal Filipino and Vietnamese women. Cancer 2013; 119:3746-52.
Love, R.R., Laudico, A.V., Dinh, N.V. et al.: Timing of adjuvant surgical oophorectomy in the menstrual cycle and disease-free and overall survival in premenopausal women with operable breast cancer. Journal of the National Cancer Institute 2015 107 (3): djv064 doi: 10.1093/jnci/djv064
Love, R. R., Hossain, S.M., Hussain, M. et al.: Luteal versus follicular phase surgical oophorectomy plus tamoxifen in premenopausal women with metastatic hormone receptor positive breast cancer. Euro J Cancer 2016. 60:107-116. https://dx.doi.org/10.1016/j.ejca.2016.03.011
Love, R.R., Ferdousy, T., Paudel, B.D., Nahar, S., Dowla, R., Adibuzzaman, M., Ahsan, G.M.T., Uddin, M., Salim, R., and Ahamed, S.I.: Symptom levels in care-seeking Bangladeshi and Nepalese adults with advanced cancer. J Global Oncology July 27, 2016, doi:10.1200/JGO.2016.004119
Love, R.R.: Adjuvant surgical oophorectomy plus tamoxifen in premenopausal women with operable breast cancer: a global treatment option. Clin Breast Cancer 2016.16: 233-7. https://dx.doi.org/10.1016/j.clbc.2016.03.003.
Hart, C.D.*, Tenori, L.*, Vignoli, A., Uy, G., To, V.T., Adebamowo, C.,  Biganzoli, L. Risi, E., Love, R.R.**, Luchinat, C.,**, Di Leo, A.** (*Co-first authors; **Co-senior authors) Serum metabolomic profiles identify early breast cancer patients at increased risk of disease recurrence in a multicenter population. Clinical Cancer Research 2017. DOI: 10.1158/1078-0432.CCR-16-1153

References

Breast cancer organizations
Organizations established in 1993
Organizations disestablished in 2015
Cancer charities in the United States